Allison W. Pearson is an American management scientist, the W. L. Giles Professor Emeritus at Mississippi State University, and a former interim associate vice president of the university.

References

Mississippi State University faculty
Auburn University alumni
University of Southern Mississippi
Living people
Year of birth missing (living people)